Alisdair "Ali" Sutherland (born 19 September 1996) is a Scottish professional footballer who plays as a forward for Brora Rangers.

Career
Born in Brora, Sutherland began his career at Inverness Caledonian Thistle, making his senior debut in January 2015. He spent time on loan at Highland League club Brora Rangers during the second half of the 2015–16 season, and signed his first professional contract with Inverness Caledonian Thistle at the end of that season.

After being released by Caley Thistle in January 2017, Sutherland signed for Scottish League Two side Elgin City on a deal until the end of the 2016–17 season, subsequently signing a new contract in June 2017.

After a loan spell with the club, Sutherland signed a deal with Highland League side Rothes. Sutherland helped the Speysiders finish 3rd in the league and win the Highland League Cup, the club's first silverware in 41 years.

In March 2021, Sutherland returned to his hometown club Brora Rangers on a three-year deal.

Career statistics

Honours 
Rothes

 Highland League Cup: 2019–20

References

1996 births
Living people
Scottish footballers
Inverness Caledonian Thistle F.C. players
Brora Rangers F.C. players
Elgin City F.C. players
Association football forwards
Scottish Professional Football League players
Rothes F.C. players
Highland Football League players
People from Brora